A pyrophile or pyrophilic insect is an insect which has evolved to rely upon fire ecology for important parts of their life cycle.  Pyrophiles usually occur alongside, and co-evolve with pyrophytes, those plants which rely upon natural fires as part of their lifecycle.

These insects have evolved to be able to rapidly colonize environments after a wildfire. Highly sensitive infrared receptors are thought to have evolved independently in at least four different groups of insects.

Little is known about the ecological interactions and consequences of pyrophilic insects, though they are known mostly amongst flies and beetles. Flies of the genus Microsania are some of the most numerous and well-described pryophilic insects.

Various theories explain these fire-loving adaptations as owing to the weakening of the host plant, the sterilization of the medium into which the eggs are laid, or the elimination of competitive or predatory organisms.

References 

Insects